Manuel Tagüeña Lacorte (1913–1971) was a Spanish military officer of the Spanish Republican Army. Before the Spanish Civil War, he was a member of the socialist youth and studied mathematics and physics at Madrid University. In July 1936 he led a militia column in the Somosierra front, in August on the Tagus front and took part in the defense of Madrid. He joined the PCE in November 1936 and was one of the first commanders of the mixed brigades. He rose through the ranks from company to army corps commander and he was promoted to Colonel. He was one of the Republican commanders in the retreat of Aragon. In the battle of the Ebro and in the Catalonia Offensive, he led the  XV Army Corps of Modesto's Army of the Ebro.  After Casado’s coup in March 1939 he fled from the Monòver airfield to France.

After the war, he came to Mexico, left the PCE and died there in 1971.

References

Bibliography
Beevor, Antony. The battle for Spain. The Spanish civil war, 1936–1939. Penguin Books. 2006. London. . 
Jackson, Gabriel. The Spanish Republic and the Civil War, 1931–1939. Princeton University Press. 1967. Princeton.   
Preston, Paul. The Spanish Civil War. Reaction, revolution & revenge. Harper Perennial. 2006. London. ,  
Thomas, Hugh. The Spanish Civil War. Penguin Books. 2001. London. 

Spanish military personnel of the Spanish Civil War (Republican faction)
1913 births
1971 deaths
Exiles of the Spanish Civil War in the Soviet Union
Exiles of the Spanish Civil War in France
Exiles of the Spanish Civil War in Mexico
Communist Party of Spain politicians